Wayomenomics “create, loot, and share” the nation’s resources. or Is a word used by Ghanaian economist and Former Deputy Governor of Bank of Ghana  Mahamudu Bawumia to describe the alleged corruption in the NDC (National Democratic Congress) that awarded 51 million GH₵ to businessman Mr Alfred Agbeshi Wayome without any government contract.  economic policies implemented by President John Mahama are responsible for the hardship in the country. instead of practicing sound economic policies to improve the fortunes of Ghanaians, the President has led an agenda
“Under the eight years of the NDC…President Mahama

References 

Corruption in Ghana